Eve Louise Ewing (born 1986) is an American sociologist, author, poet, and visual artist from Chicago, Illinois. Ewing is a tenured professor at the School of Social Service Administration at the University of Chicago. Her academic research in the sociology of education includes her 2018 book, Ghosts in the Schoolyard: Racism and School Closings on Chicago’s South Side, a study of school closures in Chicago. She is the former editor at Seven Scribes and the author of the poetry collection Electric Arches which was released in September 2017.  In 2019, she published 1919, a poetry collection centered around the Chicago race riot of 1919. Additionally, Ewing is the author of the Ironheart comic book series for Marvel centered on the young heroine Riri Williams.

Early life and education
Ewing grew up in the Logan Square neighborhood of Chicago. Her mother worked as a radio reporter and producer and her father an artist. Ewing attended Northside College Preparatory High School, then the University of Chicago for college. She earned a Master of Arts in Teaching in Elementary Education from Dominican University and taught middle school Language Arts in Chicago Public Schools before attending Harvard where she earned a Masters of Education in Education Policy and Management (2013), then a doctorate from Harvard University's Graduate School of Education (2016). At Harvard, Ewing served as editor and co-chair of the Harvard Educational Review.

Career

Writing
Ewing's writing includes poetry, prose and journalism, in addition to her academic scholarship. She has been a Pushcart Prize nominee and a finalist for the Pamet River Prize for a first or second full-length book of poetry or prose by a female-identified or genderqueer author. ProPublica named her Seven Scribes article on the fight to save Chicago State University to its list of "The Best MuckReads on America’s Troubled History With Race". Writing for The Huffington Post, Zeba Blay named Ewing's essay on Joshua Beal's death to a list of "30 Of The Most Important Articles By People Of Color In 2016." For NPR, Gene Demby praised Ewing's "moving essay...about the fight over the future of Dyett High in Chicago." In Chicago Magazine in 2017, Adam Morgan described her as one of the city's "most visible cultural icons." Ewing is a contributor to the 2019 anthology New Daughters of Africa, edited by Margaret Busby.

Ewing has also drawn notice for her commentary on subjects like colorism, school choice, federal arts funding, Frank Ocean and Harper Lee, race in publishing and in visual culture. Ewing's Twitter account, operated as "Wikipedia Brown", drew 30 million views a month as of September 2017.

Ewing serves on the editorial board for In These Times, as co-director of arts organization Crescendo Literary, and as co-founder of the Echo Hotel poetry collective with Hanif Abdurraqib.

Electric Arches 
Ewing's first book, a collection of poetry, prose, and visual art entitled Electric Arches, was published by Haymarket Books on September 12, 2017. Ewing has stated the entire book is based on real-life incidents that have happened to her.

Publishers Weekly named Electric Arches one of its most anticipated books of the fall of 2017 (selected from 14,000 new releases), calling it a "stunning debut". The Paris Review selected Electric Arches as a staff pick for the week on September 1, 2017, noting Ewing writes "trenchantly and tenderly" with "conversational...verse lulling the reader into territory that feels familiar, even when it isn't—into a world of 'Kool cigarette green,' 'lime popsicles,' and 'promised light.'" Writing for the Pacific Standard, Elizabeth King described Electric Arches as "at once a portrait of [Ewing's Chicago] home, a tender letter to black youth, and a call to her audience to think beyond the confines of systemic racism." The book won a 2018 Alex Award from the Young Adult Library Services Association of the American Library Association, the Chicago Review of Books 2017 poetry award, and the Poetry Society of America's Norma Farber First Book Award.

Comics
Ewing is the current writer of the Marvel series Ironheart, the first issue of which was published November 2018. She has also written for Ms. Marvel and Marvel Team-Up.

1919 
1919 is a collection of poems and children's songs based on the stoning and resulting drowning of Eugene Williams in Lake Michigan and the ensuing Chicago race riot of 1919. 1919 has excerpts from "The Negro In Chicago: A Study On Race Relations And A Race Riot", a text commissioned by the city of Chicago and written in the aftermath of the riots as an attempt to understand how and why the events occurred and what could be done to ensure that race riots would never again occur. Excerpts from "The Negro in Chicago" are used at the top of Ewing's poems to provide additional context for her writing. 1919 was published in 2019 and was selected on NPR's Best Books of 2019, Chicago Tribune's Notable Books of 2019, Chicago Review of Books Best Poetry Book of 2019, O Magazine Best Books by Women of Summer 2019, The Millions Must-Read Poetry of June 2019, and LitHub Most Anticipated Reads of Summer 2019.

Scholarship
Ewing's academic research focuses on school closures. She earned a doctorate from the Harvard Graduate School of Education, writing a dissertation on school closures in Chicago entitled "Shuttered Schools in the Black Metropolis: Race, History, and Discourse on Chicago’s South Side." Her book on school closures, Ghosts in the Schoolyard: Racism and School Closings on Chicago’s South Side, was released in October 2018 by the University of Chicago Press. Ghosts in the Schoolyard examines the demise of public schools in Chicago's Bronzeville district after the demolition of public housing, and analyzes community efforts to keep the schools open, including a community-wide hunger strike. In her book, Ewing introduces a concept called "institutional mourning", which refers to the multiple negative impacts experienced by the residents of areas where schools have been closed. According to The Chicago Reader, "she finds that school closures are a form of publicly sanctioned violence that not only derails black children's futures but also erases a community's past."

Ewing was a Provost's Postdoctoral Scholar at the University of Chicago, then became an assistant professor in the School of Social Service Administration at the University of Chicago in 2018.

Visual art
In addition to her writing and research, Ewing is a visual artist. In 2016, she became the inaugural Artist-in-Residence at the Boston Children's Museum. Her installation "A Map Home" explored place and childhood exploration. The project became the subject of a short film by Rene Dongo and an episode of Coorain Lee's webseries, Coloring Coorain!

Ewing has also served as program and community manager at the Urbano Project, a youth arts and activism project in Boston, Massachusetts.

Podcast
Ewing launched a podcast called Bughouse Square in October 2018. Using archival footage of oral historian Studs Terkel in the beginning of each episode, Ewing then interviews a guest in a conversation with parallel themes. According to BroadwayWorld, "Compelling guest commentary and host insights bring to life the most provocative and compelling topics from Terkel's day and ours, and the series includes recorded conversations with such seminal figures as James Baldwin, Shel Silverstein, and Lorraine Hansberry, plus new exchanges with professors, authors, and cultural critics."

Personal life
Ewing is married to Damon Jones, an associate professor at the Harris School of Public Policy at the University of Chicago.

Awards and recognition 
2016–2017 Distinguished Dissertation Award, American Educational Research Association
2017 Top Ten Books of the Year, Chicago Tribune
 2017 CPL Top 10 Best Best Books of the Year, Chicago Public Library
 2017 Best Poetry Book, Chicago Review of Books
 2018 Alex Award, Young Adult Library Services Association of the American Library Association
 2019 Best Books of 2019, NPR
 2019 Notable Books of 2019, Chicago Tribune
 2019 Best Poetry Book of 2019, Chicago Review of Books
 2019 Best Books by Women of Summer 2019, O Magazine
 2019 Must-Read Poetry of June 2019, The Millions 
 2019 Most Anticipated Reads of Summer 2019, LitHub

References

External links
 
 Electric Arches at Haymarket Books
 PostBourgie podcast (September 21, 2015): "Episode 36: What It Means to Lose a School"
 WBEZ Chicago (August 31, 2015): "Dyett hunger strike enters third week"
Eve L. Ewing papers at The Newberry

Living people
American sociologists
American women sociologists
21st-century American writers
African-American poets
African-American comics creators
American women poets
Harvard Graduate School of Education alumni
Artists from Chicago
Marvel Comics people
Marvel Comics writers
Writers from Chicago
University of Chicago alumni
Dominican University (Illinois) alumni
American comics writers
1986 births
21st-century American women writers
21st-century American poets
Female comics writers
21st-century African-American women writers
21st-century African-American writers
20th-century African-American people
20th-century African-American women